Hugh Ryde Heath Dolby (6 March 1888 – June 1964) was an English professional footballer who made two appearances in the Football League for Chelsea as an outside right.

Career statistics

References

1888 births
English footballers
Sportspeople from Agra
Brentford F.C. players
English Football League players
Association football outside forwards
Nunhead F.C. players
1964 deaths
Chelsea F.C. players
Southern Football League players
Europeans in India
British people in colonial India
Footballers from Uttar Pradesh